Cel shading or toon shading is a type of non-photorealistic rendering designed to make 3-D computer graphics appear to be flat by using less shading color instead of a shade gradient or tints and shades.  A cel shader is often used to mimic the style of a comic book or cartoon and/or give the render a characteristic paper-like texture. There are similar techniques that can make an image look like a sketch, an oil painting or an ink painting. The name comes from cels (short for celluloid), clear sheets of acetate which were painted on for use in traditional 2D animation.

Basic process 

The cel-shading process starts with a typical 3D model.  Where cel-shading differs from conventional rendering is in its non-photorealistic shading algorithm.  Conventional smooth lighting values are calculated for each pixel and then quantized to a small number of discrete shades to create the characteristic "flat look", where the shadows and highlights appear as blocks of color rather than being smoothly mixed in a gradient.

Outlines

Wireframe method
Black ink outlines and contour lines can be created using a variety of methods. One popular method is to first render a black outline, slightly larger than the object itself. Back-face culling is inverted and the back-facing triangles are drawn in black. To dilate the silhouette, these back-faces may be drawn in wireframe multiple times with slight changes in translation. Alternatively, back-faces may be rendered solid-filled, with their vertices translated along their vertex normals in a vertex shader.  After drawing the outline, back-face culling is set back to normal to draw the shading and optional textures of the object.  Finally, the image is composited via Z-buffering, as the back-faces always lie deeper in the scene than the front-faces.  The result is that the object is drawn with a black outline and interior contour lines.  The term "cel-shading" is popularly used to refer to the application of this "ink" outlining process in animation and games, although originally the term referred to the flat shading technique regardless of whether the outline was applied.

The Utah teapot rendered using cel shading:

 The back faces are drawn with thick lines
 The object faces are drawn using a single color
 Shading is applied

Steps 2 and 3 can be combined using multitexturing (part of texture mapping).

Edge-detection method

In video games 

The Sega Dreamcast title Jet Set Radio, which was revealed at the 1999 Tokyo Game Show, drew media attention for its cel-shaded style. It used cel-shading for its characters and its vibrant visual style has had a lasting influence on the use of cel-shading in video games. Since the early 2000s, many notable video games have made use of this style, such as The Legend of Zelda: The Wind Waker (2002) and Ōkami (2006).

Cel shading, in contrast to other visual styles such as photorealism, is often used to lend a more artistic or fantastical element to a video game's environment. In developing Ōkami, director Hideki Kamiya described his vision for the game's graphics: "I wanted to create a game with the natural beauty of the Japanese countryside... to make a world that was glistening and beautiful." Producer Atsushi Inaba recalls in a 2004 interview that Clover Studios had "abandoned the realistic style" for Ōkami as they became inspired by traditional Japanese art.

Game studios might choose a style such as cel shading in their development for reasons beyond artistic vision. Cel shaded graphics are usually simple in visual information, which can be useful in some applications. In the case of The Legend of Zelda: The Wind Waker, developer Satoru Takizawa states that using this style allowed to “represent the mechanisms and objects for puzzles [in The Wind Waker] in a more easy-to-understand way.” Takizawa also argues that photorealistic graphics, in contrast, would have “had the adverse effect of making information difficult to represent game-wise.”

Lists of cel-shaded media

Film

 The Great Mouse Detective, a 1986 American animated film based on "Basil of Baker Street" by Eve Titus and Paul Galdone.
 Technological Threat, a 1988 American animated short made by Brian Jennings and Bill Kroyer and was produced by Kroyer Films.
 Felidae, a 1994 German adult animated mystery film directed by Michael Schaack, written by Martin Kluger, Stefaan Schieder and Akif Pirinçci, and based on Pirinçci's 1989 novel of the same name.
 Tarzan, a 1999 American animated adventure film based on the 1912 story "Tarzan of the Apes" by Edgar Rice Burroughs.
 Help! I'm a Fish, a 2000 Danish-German-Irish traditionally animated science fantasy musical film.
 The Adventures of Rocky and Bullwinkle (2000)
 The Little Polar Bear, a 2001 German animated film based on Hans de Beer books.
 Spirit: Stallion of the Cimarron, a 2002 American animated Western film.
 Brother Bear, a 2003 American animated musical fantasy comedy-drama film.
 Hot Wheels: World Race, a 2003 computer-animated direct-to-video film.
 Appleseed, a 2004 Japanese animated film.
 Stuart Little 3: Call of the Wild, a 2005 American computer-animated comedy film.
 A Scanner Darkly, a 2006 film based on Philip K. Dick novel.
 Horrid Henry: The Movie, a 2011 British 3D children's film based on the fictional character Horrid Henry from the children's book series of the same name by Francesca Simon.
 Paperman, a 2012 American black-and-white computer-cel animated short film.
 Feast, a 2014 American 2D animated romantic comedy short film.
 The Peanuts Movie (2015)
 Mutafukaz: Operation Blackhead, a 2017 crime short film that became the basis for the comic book for the same name produced by Run.
 Spider-Man: Into the Spider-Verse (2018)
 Tom & Jerry (2021)
 Chip 'n Dale: Rescue Rangers (2022)
 The Pink Panther directed by Jeff Fowler (Upcoming Film)

Television
 Molly, Star-Racer - a 2001 French television pilot produced by Sparx Animation Studios
 Spider-Man: The New Animated Series - a 2003 Canadian-American television series produced by Mainframe Studios, Marvel Enterprises, Adelaide Productions, and Sony Pictures Television
 Boo! - a 2003 British television series produced by Tell-Tale Productions
 Dragon Booster - a 2004 Canadian television series produced by Nerd Corps Entertainment
 Handy Manny - a 2006 American-Canadian children's television series produced by Nelvana
 Z-Squad - a 2006 South Korean-Canadian magical girl television series produced by Enemes, SBS, CJ Entertainment, and Nelvana
 The Land Before Time - a 2007 American animated television series, based on The Land Before Time film series created by Judy Freudberg and Tony Geiss
 Storm Hawks - a 2007 Canadian television series produced by Nerd Corps Entertainment
 League of Super Evil - a 2009 Canadian television series produced by Nerd Corps Entertainment
 Bunny Maloney - a 2009 French television series produced by MoonScoop Group, France 2, and Telegael
 Iron Man: Armored Adventures - a 2009 French-American television series produced by Marvel Animation
 Hot Wheels Battle Force 5 - a 2009 Canadian television series produced by Nerd Corps Entertainment and Nelvana
 Rated A for Awesome - a 2011 Canadian television series produced by Nerd Corps Entertainment
 Last Week Tonight with John Oliver - a 2014 American late-night talk and news satire television series produced by HBO - Episode 7: Immigration Reform
 Regal Academy - a 2016 Italian television series produced by Rainbow S.p.A.
 Disenchantment - a 2018 American animated satirical fantasy sitcom created by Matt Groening for Netflix.
 Star Wars Resistance - a 2018 American television series produced by Lucasfilm Animation
 What If...?'' - a 2021 Marvel Studios alternate history television series set in the Marvel Cinematic Universe

Video games

See also 
2.5D
Gooch shading
Low poly

References

External links 
 IGN: Jet Set Radio review. Retrieved August 4, 2005.
 GameDev.net – Cel-Shading. Retrieved August 5, 2005 (Wayback Machine copy).
 sunandblackcat.com – Cel-Shading. Retrieved August 7, 2014.

Animation techniques
 
Computer animation
Shading
Video game graphics